The 2013–14 Australian Figure Skating Championships was held in Melbourne from 30 November through 6 December 2013. Skaters competed in the disciplines of men's singles, ladies' singles, pair skating, ice dancing, and synchronized skating across many levels, including senior, junior, novice, intermediate, and primary divisions.

Senior results

Men

Ladies

Pairs

Ice dancing

Synchronized

External links
 2013–14 Australian Figure Skating Championships results

Australian Figure Skating Championships
Australia, 2013
Australia, 2014
Fig
Fig